Lightning Love is an indie pop band based in Ypsilanti, Michigan, United States.  With keyboard and vocals by Leah Diehl, Ben Collins on Guitar, and Aaron Diehl on drums.  Their sound is up-beat and minimal, contrasted by lyrics that often express isolation and self-consciousness.

History

Formation (2007)
Lightning Love is an indie pop trio formed in the fall of 2007. Leah, Aaron and Ben, all former members of the band Minor Planets, formed Lightning Love in the fall of 2007. They released their self-recorded and produced album, November Birthday, in December 2008. The group has been on an unofficial hiatus since February 2013.

Pop culture

Discography
 November Birthday  LP (2008)
 Girls Who Look Like Me  EP (2012)
 Blonde Album  LP (2012)

See also
Music of Detroit

References

External links
 Bandcamp
 MySpace

Indie rock musical groups from Michigan
2007 establishments in Michigan